Kobe Mutch (born 18 March 1998) is a former professional Australian rules footballer who played for the Essendon Football Club in the Australian Football League (AFL) between 2017 and 2020. Mutch, who was named in the 2016 Under 18s All-Australian team, was selected by Essendon with their fourth selection and forty-second overall in the 2016 national draft. He spent the 2017 season in Essendon's reserves team in the Victorian Football League (VFL), where he came second in Essendon's best and fairest. On September 20, 2020, Essendon announced that Mutch would not be offered a contract for the 2021 season.

References

External links

  

1998 births
Living people
Essendon Football Club players
Bendigo Pioneers players
Australian rules footballers from Victoria (Australia)